Laurenti Magesa ( 1946 – August 11, 2022) was a Catholic priest and theologian from Tanzania. He has been a major figure in developing African theology, having written a dozen books on topics such as African Christology  and African spirituality. He has been called, "One of Africa's foremost theologians." He has served as a parish priest and taught theology at schools in Kenya, Tanzania and the United States.

Early life and career

Magesa was born in 1946 in northern Tanzania, along the shores of Lake Victoria. He attended primary school in Musoma and then attended secondary and high school at St. Mary’s Seminary in Mwanza, Tanzania, graduating in 1968. He earned a degree in theology at Makerere University in Uganda in 1974, before earning an MA and PhD from the University of Ottawa. From 1985 until 2000, he served as a parish priest at several Catholic parishes in Musoma, Tanzania.

Magesa has published more than 100 academic articles and numerous books. He has taught at Hekima University College, a Jesuit school of theology in Nairobi, the Catholic University of Eastern Africa, and Kipalapala Major Seminary, in Tabora, Tanzania. He has been a scholar in residence or visiting scholar at Xavier University in Cincinnati, Ohio, DePaul University in Chicago, and the Maryknoll School of Theology in New York. He received an honorary Doctorate of Humane Letters from DePaul University in 2014.

Works on African religion and Africa theology

Magesa's academic works have focused on moral theology. His articles and books have sought to explore ideas about Jesus, the church, and Christian ethics in an African context. Much of his work falls into the area of African theology known as the theology of inculturation. In reflecting on his theological work, Magesa has explained that he believes that African conceptions of theology differ from those of the West. He has written, "I have grown more and more to accept that although we may all see the same reality, we may, and do, at the same time see different things in reality"

Magesa's most influential work is "What Is Not Sacred? African Spirituality." In this book, Magesa seeks to explain the central ideas that are common to traditional African religions. He argues that African religions see spirituality in all human interactions with the world. He also suggests that African religious ideas are consistent rather than in conflict with Christian ideas. This book builds on one of Magesa's earlier books on African religion, "African Religion: The Moral Traditions of Abundant Life."

Published works

The Post-conciliar Church in Africa: No Turning Back the Clock (2016)
What Is Not Sacred? African Spirituality (2013)
African Religion in the Dialogue Debate: From Intolerance to Coexistence (2010)
Rethinking Mission: Evangelization in Africa in a New Era (2006)
Anatomy of Inculturation: Transforming the Church in Africa (2004)
Christian Ethics in Africa (2002)
Democracy and Reconciliation in African Christianity (with Z. Nthamburi) (1999) 
African Religion: The Moral Traditions of Abundant Life (1997)
The Church in African Christianity (with JNK Mugambi) (1990)
Jesus in Africa christianity : experimentation and diversity in African Christology (With Jesse Mugambi) (1989)
African Christian Marriage (with A. Shorter) (1977)
The Church and Liberation in Africa (1976)

References

Living people
Tanzanian Roman Catholic priests
1946 births
20th-century Roman Catholic theologians
Makerere University alumni
University of Ottawa alumni
People from Musoma
Academic staff of the Catholic University of Eastern Africa